Rancho La Misión may refer to:
La Misión (Rancho La Misión), Coahuila, a town in Coahuila, Mexico
La Misión, Sinaloa, a town in Sinaloa, Mexico